The 2018 PSMS season is PSMS Medan's first season in the Liga 1. It will see them compete in the Liga 1, as well as the Indonesia's President Cup and Piala Indonesia.

Players

Squad information
Note: Flags indicate national team as has been defined under FIFA eligibility rules. Players may hold more than one non-FIFA nationality.

Goal scorers

Pre-season friendlies

Indonesia President's Cup

Competitions

Go-Jek Liga 1

League table

Result summary

Results by matchday

Matches

Piala Indonesia

References

PSMS Medan
Indonesian football clubs 2018 season